Aleksander Komor (born 24 June 1994) is a Polish professional footballer who plays as a centre-back for Resovia.

Career

Podbeskidzie
On 9 July 2018, Komor joined Polish I liga club Podbeskidzie Bielsko-Biała.

References

External links

Polish footballers
1994 births
Living people
Ruch Chorzów players
Motor Lublin players
Górnik Łęczna players
Podbeskidzie Bielsko-Biała players
GKS Jastrzębie players
Resovia (football) players
Ekstraklasa players
I liga players
II liga players
Sportspeople from Lublin
Association football defenders
21st-century Polish people